Why Does Love Do This To Me: The Exponents Greatest Hits is a greatest hits collection by the New Zealand band The Exponents, released in November 2011 to mark the group's 30th anniversary. It includes the track "It's Rugby", which was recorded specifically for the album. The album reached number 31 on the New Zealand music charts.
In May 2013, Universal Music released a deluxe edition of the album with a new cover and bundled with The Exponents' Eight Days at Roundhead album on both digital and CD formats.

Track listing 
 "Do You Feel In Love"
 "Why Does Love Do This To Me"
 "Christchurch (In Cashel St. I Wait)"
 "Know Your Own Heart"
 "One In A Lifetime"
 "Whatever Happened To Tracey"
 "All I Can Do"
 "It’s Rugby"
 "Caroline Skies"
 "Sink Like A Stone"
 "Sex & Agriculture"
 "Your Best Friend Loves Me Too" (original version)
 "Like She Said"
 "Only I Could Die (And Love You Still)"
 "Victoria" (single version)
 "Greater Hopes Greater Expectations"
 "Erotic" (7″ edit)
 "Change Your Mind"
 "Who Loves Who The Most'
 "La La Lulu"
 "Close" (radio edit)
 "Airway Spies"
 "Summer You Never Meant"
 "I’ll Say Goodbye (Even Though I’m Blue)"

Charts

References 

2011 greatest hits albums
The Exponents albums
Universal Music Group compilation albums